Lazizbek Mullojonov is an Uzbekistani professional boxer. As an amateur, he won a gold medal at the 2022 Asian Championships as a super-heavyweight.

Amateur career

2021 
At the end of September 2021, he became the world champion at the 58th Military World Boxing Championship in Moscow (Russia) held under the auspices of the International Military Sports Council, in the final, by a split decision of the judges, defeating an experienced Russian Svyatoslav Teterin.

At the end of October - at the beginning of November 2021 in Belgradee (Serbia), participated in the 2021 AIBA World Boxing Championships in the category over 92 kg. Where in 1/16 finals defeated the experienced Iranian Puria Amiri on points, in the 1/8 finals he defeated the Englishman Delicious Ori, but in the quarterfinal on points in a competitive battle he lost to the Armenian David Chaloyan - who became the silver medalist of this world championship.

2022 
In February 2022, he became the champion in the weight category over 92 kg of the prestigious international Strandzha Cup held in Sofia (Bulgaria), where he defeated the experienced Russian Yaroslava Doronicheva, then in the semi-finals by points of victories Kazakh silt Nurlan Saparbay, and in the final he defeated the experienced German boxer Nelvy Tiafaka.

Professional career 

On January 29, 2021 in Moscow (Russia) made his debut in the professional ring, ahead of schedule by technical knockout in the 2nd round, defeating Russian Alexander Stepanov (2-2).

Professional boxing record

References

External links

 
 
 
 
 
 
 
 
 Лазизбек Муллажонов

Year of birth missing (living people)
Living people
People from Fergana
People from Fergana Region
Uzbekistani male boxers
Medalists in boxing
Universiade medalists in boxing
AIBA World Boxing Championships medalists
Asian Games medalists in boxing
Universiade gold medalists for Uzbekistan
Super-heavyweight boxers
21st-century Uzbekistani people